The Great Britain men's national artistic gymnastics team represents Great Britain in FIG international competitions.

History
British gymnasts first competed at the Olympic Games in 1908. They won their first Olympic team medal, a bronze, at the 1912 Olympic Games. They would win their second team medal, another bronze, 100 years later at the 2012 Olympic Games.

Team competition results

Olympic Games
 1908 – 8th place
See team members
 1912 —  bronze medal
Albert Betts, William Cowhig, Sidney Cross, Harold Dickason, Herbert Drury, Bernard Franklin, Leonard Hanson, Samuel Hodgetts, Charles Luck, William MacKune, Ronald McLean, Alfred Messenger, Henry Oberholzer, Edward Pepper, Edward Potts, Reginald Potts, George Ross, Charles Simmons, Arthur Southern, William Titt, Charles Vigurs, Samuel Walker, John Whitaker
 1920 – 5th place
Sidney Andrew, Albert Betts, Arthur Cocksedge, James Cotterell, William Cowhig, Sidney Cross, Horace Dawswell, J. E. Dingley, Sidney Domville, H. W. Doncaster, Reginald Edgecombe, Wyndham Edwards, Harry Finchett, Bernard Franklin, J. Harris, Samuel Hodgetts, Stanley Leigh, George Masters, Ronald McLean, Oliver Morris, Ted Ness, A. E. Page, Alfred Pinner, Teddy Pugh, H. W. Taylor, John Walker, Ralph Yandell
 1924 – 6th place
 Stanley Leigh, Harold Brown, Harry Finchett, Fred Hawkins, Thomas Hopkins, Ernest Leigh,  Stan Humphreys, Alfred Spencer
 1928 – 11th place
 Arthur Whitford, E. W. Warren, Bert Cronin, E. A. Walton, T. B. Parkinson, Gilbert Raynes, Harry Finchett,  Stan Humphreys
 1948 – 12th place
 George Weedon, Frank Turner, Ken Buffin, Alec Wales, Percy May, Jack Flaherty, Glyn Hopkins, Ivor Vice
 1952 – 21st place
Ken Buffin, Graham Harcourt, Peter Starling, Frank Turner, George Weedon, Jack Whitford
 1960 – 19th place
Ken Buffin, Dick Gradley, John Mulhall, Jack Pancott, Peter Starling, Nik Stuart
 1984 – 9th place
 Terry Bartlett, Richard Benyon, Keith Langley, Andrew Morris, Eddie Van Hoof, Barry Winch
 1988 — did not qualify a team
 1992 – 12th place
 Terence Bartlett, Paul Bowler, Marvin Campbell, David Cox, James Michael May, Neil Thomas
 1996 — did not qualify a team
 2000 — did not qualify a team
 2004 — did not qualify a team
 2008 — did not qualify a team
 2012 —  bronze medal
 Sam Oldham, Daniel Purvis, Louis Smith, Kristian Thomas, Max Whitlock
 2016 — 4th place
 Brinn Bevan, Louis Smith, Kristian Thomas, Max Whitlock, Nile Wilson
 2020 — 4th place
 Joe Fraser, James Hall, Giarnni Regini-Moran, Max Whitlock

World Championships

 2010 – 7th place
 Kristian Thomas, Daniel Purvis, Samuel Hunter, Theo Seager, Ruslan Panteleymonov, Louis Smith
 2011 – 10th place (did not qualify for team final)
 Sam Oldham, Ruslan Panteleymonov, Daniel Purvis, Louis Smith, Kristian Thomas
 2014 – 4th place
 Dan Keatings, Daniel Purvis, Kristian Thomas, Courtney Tulloch, Max Whitlock, Nile Wilson
 2015 –  silver medal
 Brinn Bevan, Daniel Purvis, Louis Smith, Kristian Thomas, Max Whitlock, Nile Wilson, James Hall
 2018 – 5th place
 Brinn Bevan, Dominick Cunningham, Joe Fraser, James Hall, Max Whitlock 
 2019 – 5th place
 Dominick Cunningham, Joe Fraser, James Hall, Giarnni Regini-Moran, Max Whitlock 
 2022 –  bronze medal
 Joe Fraser, James Hall, Jake Jarman, Giarnni Regini-Moran, Courtney Tulloch, Adam Tobin

Junior World Championships
 2019 — 14th place
 Sam Mostowfi, Jasper Smith-Gordon, Luke Whitehouse

Most decorated gymnasts
This list includes all British male artistic gymnasts who have won at least two medals at the Olympic Games or the World Artistic Gymnastics Championships combined.

See also 
 Great Britain women's national artistic gymnastics team
 List of Olympic male artistic gymnasts for Great Britain

References 

Gymnastics in the United Kingdom
National men's artistic gymnastics teams
Gymnastics